Bogwoman is a 1997 drama film directed by Tom Collins and starring Rachael Dowling, Peter Mullan, Sean McGinley, Noelle Brown. It follows the story of Maureen, a woman born in the Boglands of County Donegal who moves across the border to the Bogside to marry a Derry (Northern Ireland) man.

Etymology of title
"Bogwoman" is a play on the term of abuse shouted at a Derry woman by the British Army; the term is a play on the word used to describe those women that live in the IRA stronghold of the Bogside in Derry.

External links
 

Irish television films
1997 films
1997 drama films
Irish-language films
1990s English-language films